Kilconnell or Killconnell Abbey()  is a ruined medieval Franciscan friary located in Kilconnell, County Galway, Ireland.

History 
Kilconnell Abbey was founded by  William Buí O'Kelly between 1353 and 1414. The Observant reform was introduced at some point prior to 1464. In the 1680s the abbey underwent repairs. 

Following the Bishops' Banishment Act of 1697, the Franciscan community largely dispersed from the area. Though local tradition identifies the departure of the monks from the abbey as being just before the Battle of Aughrim in 1691, in reality the friars were present until at least 1766, when there were ten friars working in the area, though by 1801 the last of the friars had left the area.

Writing in 1901, the abbey ruins were described as being in a near perfect state of preservation. In 1978, Patrick Conlan stated that though the some sections of the cloister were missing, the east range of the convent and the church (including the tower and transept chancel) were complete.

Historical artefacts 
A number of artefacts, including chalices and several books were associated with the friary. One of these chalices, known as the Frances Guiffe chalice, dates from 1638 and is in the keeping of University College Dublin. Another, the Irish Provincial Chalice, also known as the Terlagh O Briene chalice is in possession of the Australian Catholic University.

References

Notes

Sources 

 
 
 
 

 

Franciscan monasteries in the Republic of Ireland
Ruins in the Republic of Ireland
National Monuments in County Galway